Thomas Bunn may refer to:

 Thomas Bunn, Frome (1767–1853), English gentleman and philanthropist
 Thomas Bunn (Manitoba politician) (1830–1875), politician in Manitoba, Canada
 Tom Bunn (born c. 1959), politician in Oregon, U.S.A.